Beans and franks or franks and beans, also known regionally by the brand name Beanee Weenees, is a dish that can be a main course or a side. Often served in informal settings, it is similar to pork and beans, but substitutes hot dogs for pork. July 13 is National Beans 'n' Franks Day in the United States.

History
Baked beans were among the first canned "convenience foods" to emerge in the United States, dating back to the Civil War. The exact originator of the concept of combining hot dogs and baked beans is unknown. Van Camp's owns the name Beanee Weenee and sells a canned version of the dish.

Ingredients
The standard recipe is simply canned baked beans (and juices) and sliced hot dogs, though more complex recipes have included brown sugar, onion, mustard, barbecue sauce, and various herbs and spices.

References

Baked beans